Spycraft is a 2021 American docuseries created for Netflix. Each episode details a different method used by countries in the craft of espionage from World War I era to present day, which is shown through expert interviews and archival footage. The series was released on January 20, 2021.

References

External links 

English-language Netflix original programming
Netflix original documentary television series
2020s American documentary television series
2021 American television series debuts